California Affiliated Risk Management Authority (CARMA) is a California public agency dedicated to innovative approaches in providing financial protection for its public entity members against catastrophic loss.

CARMA is an excess general liability pool consisting of five-member joint powers authorities (JPA), with over 135 underlying members. CARMA provides excess liability coverage of up to $29,000,000 per occurrence in the event of a catastrophic loss.

External links
 Official site

Insurance in the United States
Affiliated
Insurance organizations